MFC 29: Conquer was a mixed martial arts event held by the Maximum Fighting Championship (MFC) on April 8, 2011 at the Colosseum at Caesars Windsor in Windsor, Ontario. The event was broadcast on HDNet.

Background
During the broadcast of MFC 28, owner Mark Pavelich announced that he had signed recently released UFC lightweight fighter Marcus Davis to appear on this card. Davis was expected to fight Kajan Johnson at this card, however Johnson pulled out with an injured shoulder. Davis ended up fighting Curtis Demarce.

MFC 29 is the only MFC event in which all bouts took place in a circular cage instead of their signature ring. This was done in accordance with the regulations utilized in Ontario which requires all mixed martial arts fights to be held in a cage structure. The MFC held a "Name the Cage" fan contest with the winning entry receiving a trip for two to see the show, including premium tickets to the fights, airfare, ground transportation, hotel accommodations, pre-show and after-party. The new MFC cage was named "The Ring".

Results
Welterweight Championship bout:  Douglas Lima vs.  Terry Martin
Lima defeated Martin via TKO (punches) at 1:14 of round 1.
Light Heavyweight Championship bout:  Ryan Jimmo vs.  Zak Cummings
Jimmo defeated Cummings via unanimous decision (50–45, 49–46, 50–45).
Lightweight bout:  Marcus Davis vs.  Curtis Demarce
Davis defeated Demarce via split decision (28–29, 30–27, 29–28).
Catchweight (160lb) bout:  Robert Washington vs.  Hermes Franca
Franca defeated Washington via TKO (punches) at 0:26 of round 2.
Welterweight bout:  Demi Deeds vs.  Pete Spratt
Spratt defeated Deeds via submission (armbar) at 4:19 of round 2.
Middleweight bout:  Andreas Spang vs.  Ali Mokdad
Mokdad defeated Spang via submission (rear-naked choke) at 1:35 of round 1.
Welterweight bout:  Dhiego Lima vs.  Josh Taveirne
Lima defeated Taveirne via submission (rear-naked choke) at 3:35 of round 3.
Bantamweight bout:  David Harris vs.  Chuck Mady
Harris defeated Mady via submission (rear-naked choke) at 3:07 of round 1.
Lightweight bout:  Pete Brown vs.  Matthew Spisak
Spisak defeated Brown via unanimous decision.

References

29
2011 in mixed martial arts
Mixed martial arts in Canada
Sports competitions in Windsor, Ontario
2011 in Canadian sports
April 2011 sports events in Canada